This is a list of the major honours won by football clubs in Cyprus. It lists every Cypriot association football club to have won any of the major domestic trophies, the Cypriot League, the Cypriot Cup and the Cypriot Super Cup, since Cypriot clubs have not won any major official European competition yet.

Numbers in bold are record totals for that category. Clubs in italics are Double winners: they have won two or more of these trophies in the same season (excluding super cups). Trophies that were shared between two clubs are counted as honours for both teams. Clubs tied in total honours are listed chronologically by most recent honour won. 

Last updated 12 August 2022.

Sources
Rec.Sport.Soccer Statistics Foundation (Championships)
Rec.Sport.Soccer Statistics Foundation (Cups)
Rec.Sport.Soccer Statistics Foundation (Super Cups)

Cyprus by honours
 
clubs by honour